Oligosoma smithi, commonly known as the shore skink, short-tailed skink, Smith's ground skink, Smith's moco, and Smith's skink, is a species of lizard in the family Scincidae (skinks) that is native to New Zealand.

Description

It is well camouflaged, and may be found in a range of colours, sometimes almost black.

Distribution and habitat
The species is native to the northern half of the North Island of New Zealand. It is always found near the shoreline and prefers open areas such as around driftwood at the high tide mark.

Behavior
Oligosoma smithi is diurnal (active during the day) and spends most of its time hunting or basking in the sun. It eats insects and probably anything that moves and fits in its mouth.

Like most New Zealand skinks, it is viviparous (reproduces by giving birth to live young).

Conservation status
As of 2012 the Department of Conservation (DOC) classified Oligosoma smithi as Not Threatened under the New Zealand Threat Classification System.

Etymology
The specific name, smithi, is in honor of British naval officer Lt Alexander Smith who collected the original specimens in the 1840s, and presented them to his uncle John Edward Gray, who described the new species.

References

Further reading
Boulenger GA (1887). Catalogue of the Lizards in the British Museum (Natural History). Second Edition. Volume III. ... Scincidæ ... London: Trustees of the British Museum (Natural History). (Taylor and Francis, printers). xii + 575 pp. + Plates I-XL. (Lygosoma smithii, pp. 274–275).
Gray JE (1845). Catalogue of the Specimens of Lizards in the Collection of the British Museum. London: Trustees of the British Museum. (Edward Newman, printer). xxviii + 289 pp. (Mocoa smithii, new species, pp. 82–83).

External links

 3D model of a Shore skink (NOT showing natural colours)

smithi
Reptiles of New Zealand
Endemic fauna of New Zealand
Reptiles described in 1845
Taxa named by John Edward Gray
Endemic reptiles of New Zealand